Riot is a 2019 indie video game about a riot simulator based on real events. The project started with an Indiegogo campaign in February 2014, which ended in a success. The game was released on December 6, 2017, for Steam's early access. The director of the game and previously an editor and cinematographer at Valve, Leonard Menchiari, has experienced riots personally and the game "Riot" was created as a way to express it and to tell the stories of these events. The player can pick between playing as police or rioters. The game will potentially be released on Mac, Linux, iOS, and Android. The producers are interested in bringing the game to these platforms, but are currently restricted by their budget.

Gameplay
RIOT allows the player to play as both the police and rioting groups. As the police, the game revolves around strategy and planning, with a GUI that adopts a traditional police style. This contrasts the typical gameplay of the rioting group, which is adaptive and responsive, relying on the decisions the police make as opposed to long-term planning, instead relying on fast decision making skills. The game includes six main campaigns set in Italy, Greece, Spain and Egypt.

Other riots set across the world will be available as well as an unlockable. Each scenario will have different backgrounds as well as props and police uniforms. activists’ clothing will be procedurally generated. Characters will have different stats that change the way they react in different situations, This means people will act in unpredictable ways based on the elements that will happen in each riot. RIOT is planning to release an in-game level editor, using this players will be able to re-create the riots that are currently going on in the world. The levels can then be shared with anyone in the world, and can then be rated by others based on quality and historical accuracy.

Development

The scenarios in Riot were partly informed through designer Leonard Menchiari's participation in the Italian No TAV protests. Riot was part funded through an Indiegogo crowdfunding campaign, raising $36,139 in March 2013. Some of the game's budget was for travel and research. The game aims to depict scenarios in a neutral manner, allowing the player to explore both sides of the conflict.

Riot emulates a 2D retro look even though the scene is 3D, which gives more realistic lighting, physics, and visual effects. All character movements are physics based. This means that rather than following just a path, the crowd movement will be influenced by the physical contact given by the rest of the crowd. The art style is inspired by Superbrothers: Sword & Sworcery EP.

In 2019 Leonard Menchiari released the iOS version for free.

See also 

 The Eternal Castle

References

External links
 Official website

2019 video games
Indie video games
Windows games
MacOS games
Linux games
Indiegogo projects
IOS games
Android (operating system) games
Ouya games
Video games about police officers
Video games developed in Italy